Lincoln University is a census-designated place (CDP) in Lower Oxford Township, Chester County, Pennsylvania. The CDP is located near U.S. Route 1. As of the 2010 census, the population was 1,726 residents.

Demographics

References

Census-designated places in Chester County, Pennsylvania